van Rossem is a surname. Notable people with the surname include:

Adriaan Joseph van Rossem (1892–1949), American ornithologist
Daniëlle van Rossem (born 1935), Dutch fencer
George van Rossem (1882–1955), Dutch fencer
Jean-Pierre Van Rossem (1945–2018), Belgian politician and writer
Maarten van Rossem (born 1943), Dutch historian
Metejoor (born 1991), Belgian singer born Joris Van Rossem

See also 

 van Rossum, surname of similar Dutch origin
 Dutch names 

Surnames of Dutch origin